Arenig Fawr South Top is the twin top of Arenig Fawr in southern Snowdonia, North Wales. It is the second highest member of the Arenig range, being 18 m less than its twin. From here the south ridge continues into an area of rocky knolls and small tarns, where Arenig Fawr South Ridge Top can be found.

References

External links
geograph.co.uk : photos of Arenig Fawr and surrounding area

Nuttalls
Mountains and hills of Snowdonia
Mountains and hills of Gwynedd
Llanycil

cy:Arenig Fawr